Marysin may refer to the following places:
Marysin, Lower Silesian Voivodeship (south-west Poland)
Marysin, Kuyavian-Pomeranian Voivodeship (north-central Poland)
Marysin, Gmina Rejowiec in Lublin Voivodeship (east Poland)
Marysin, Gmina Mircze in Lublin Voivodeship (east Poland)
Marysin, Gmina Uchanie in Lublin Voivodeship (east Poland)
Marysin, Gmina Fajsławice in Lublin Voivodeship (east Poland)
Marysin, Gmina Bychawa in Lublin Voivodeship (east Poland)
Marysin, Gmina Jastków in Lublin Voivodeship (east Poland)
Marysin, Świdnik County in Lublin Voivodeship (east Poland)
Marysin, Gmina Telatyn in Lublin Voivodeship (east Poland)
Marysin, Gmina Tyszowce in Lublin Voivodeship (east Poland)
Marysin, Grójec County in Masovian Voivodeship (east-central Poland)
Marysin, Mińsk County in Masovian Voivodeship (east-central Poland)
Marysin, Piaseczno County in Masovian Voivodeship (east-central Poland)
Marysin, Gmina Gielniów in Masovian Voivodeship (east-central Poland)
Marysin, Gmina Potworów in Masovian Voivodeship (east-central Poland)
Marysin, Siedlce County in Masovian Voivodeship (east-central Poland)
Marysin, Sochaczew County in Masovian Voivodeship (east-central Poland)
Marysin, Wołomin County in Masovian Voivodeship (east-central Poland)
Marysin, Żuromin County in Masovian Voivodeship (east-central Poland)
Marysin, Gniezno County in Greater Poland Voivodeship (west-central Poland)
Marysin, Turek County in Greater Poland Voivodeship (west-central Poland)
Marysin, Lubusz Voivodeship (west Poland)
Marysin, Opole Voivodeship (south-west Poland)
Marysin, West Pomeranian Voivodeship (north-west Poland)